The thirty-ninth edition of the Caribbean Series (Serie del Caribe) was held from February 4 through February 9 of  with the champion baseball teams of the Dominican Republic, Águilas Cibaeñas; Mexico, Tomateros de Culiacán; Puerto Rico, Indios de Mayagüez, and Venezuela, Navegantes del Magallanes. The format consisted of 12 games, each team facing the other teams twice, and the games were played at Estadio Héctor Espino in Hermosillo, Sonora, Mexico.

Summary

Final standings

Individual leaders

All-Star team

Sources
Bjarkman, Peter. Diamonds around the Globe: The Encyclopedia of International Baseball. Greenwood. 
Serie del Caribe : History, Records and Statistics (Spanish)

Caribbean
1997
International baseball competitions hosted by Mexico
1997 in Mexican sports
1997 in Caribbean sport
Caribbean Series
Caribbean Series